

Table – Division 3A

2010–12
2010–11 in European rugby union
2011–12 in European rugby union
European Nations Cup Third Division
European Nations Cup Third Division
European Nations Cup Third Division

de:European Nations Cup 2010–2012#Division 3
fr:Championnat européen des nations de rugby à XV 2010-2012#Division 3